Georissa purchasi is a species of small land snail, a terrestrial gastropod mollusc in the family Hydrocenidae.

The type specimen is stored in the Imperial Natural History Museum, Vienna.

Description 
The shell is minute, globosely conical, translucid, imperforate (no umbilicus. The sculpture consists of very fine growth-striae only. The colour is horny-fuscous. The epidermis is thin and shiny. The spire is conical, and rather obtuse. The protoconch is minute, strongly convex, smooth. The shell has 4-5 convex whorls. The last whorl is slightly greater than one-third of the height of the shell. The base is convex. The suture is impressed. The aperture is a little oblique, subcircular. The peristome is simple, straight. The columella is slightly concave, white. The inner lip is spread over the umbilicus, sealing it up more or less completely. The callus on the penultimate whorl unites the margins, and is conspicuous.

The width of the shell is 1 mm. The height of the shell is 2 mm.

The radula was described by Suter.

Distribution
Georissa purchasi is found in New Zealand.
 North Island: Bay of Islands (Purchas, Hochstetter); Waro; Whangarei; vicinity of Auckland; Wairangi, Waikato Hunua Range; Mount Pirongia; Forty-mile Bush.
 South Island: Kenepuru Sound; Nelson; Wairoa Gorge; Greymouth; Riccarton Bush, near Christchurch.

Habitat
This species is found in native bush in very moist situations, near creeks or swamps, under stones, rotten wood, etc.

References
This article incorporates public domain text from the reference.

Further reading
 Powell A. W. B., New Zealand Mollusca, William Collins Publishers Ltd, Auckland, New Zealand 1979 

Hydrocenidae
Gastropods described in 1862